Ada Maimon (born Ada Fishman on 8 October 1893, died 10 October 1973) was an Israeli politician who served as a member of the Knesset for Mapai between 1949 and 1955.

Biography
Born in Mărculești in Bessarabia Governorate, Russian Empire (in present-day Moldova), Maimon made aliyah to Ottoman-controlled Palestine in 1912, and was followed by her older brother, Yehuda the following year. She worked as a teacher, and opened a Hebrew school for girls in Safed. Having joined a youth movement associated with Hapoel Hatzair, she became a member of the Hapoel Hatzair central committee in 1913, remaining on it until 1920.

A participant in its founding convention, she also served on the executive committee of the Histadrut trade union. In 1921 she was amongst the founders of the Women's Workers Movement, and was its secretary until 1930. In that year she established the Ayanot study centre in Ness Ziona.

Between 1946 and 1947 she served as head of the Histadrut's aliyah department, travelling to Displaced persons camps in Germany and Cyprus. In addition, she was a member of the Women's International Zionist Organization's leadership.

Having served as a member of the Assembly of Representatives during the Mandate era, Maimon was elected to the first Knesset on the Mapai list in 1949. She was re-elected in 1951, but lost her seat in the 1955 elections. She died on 10 October 1973.

Her brother, Yehuda, was amongst the signatories of the Israeli Israeli Declaration of Independence; he also served as Minister of Religion and War Victims and was a member of the Knesset for the United Religious Front between 1949 and 1951.

References

External links

1893 births
1973 deaths
People from Florești District
People from Soroksky Uyezd
Moldovan Jews
Bessarabian Jews
Emigrants from the Russian Empire to the Ottoman Empire
Jews in Ottoman Palestine
Jews in Mandatory Palestine
Israeli people of Moldovan-Jewish descent
Mapai politicians
Members of the 1st Knesset (1949–1951)
Members of the 2nd Knesset (1951–1955)
Members of the Assembly of Representatives (Mandatory Palestine)
Moldovan Zionists
Women members of the Knesset
Israeli educators
Israeli women educators
20th-century Israeli women politicians
People from Degania Bet
Women activists
Jewish women politicians